Joffrey Torvic (born 13 November 1990) is a French Guianese footballer who plays for the French Guiana national team.

International career
Torvic made his national team debut for French Guiana on 6 June 2018 in a 3–0 loss against Martinque.

Torvic scored his first goal and first competitive goal on 7 September 2018, scoring the opening goal in a 5–0 win against Anguilla, as part of 2019–20 CONCACAF Nations League qualifying.

International goals
Scores and results list French Guiana's goal tally first, score column indicates score after each Torvic goal.

References

External links
 
 

1994 births
Living people
People from Draveil
Footballers from Essonne
Association football midfielders
French Guianan footballers
French Guiana international footballers
French footballers
French people of French Guianan descent
Ligue 2 players
SC Abbeville players
US Roye-Noyon players
AS Beauvais Oise players
Paris FC players
AC Amiens players